Avicularia lynnae is a species of spiders in the family Theraphosidae, found in Ecuador and Peru. It was first described in 2017. The specific name refers to Lynn West, wife of mygalomorph expert Rick C. West.

References

Theraphosidae
Spiders described in 2017
Spiders of South America